Eucalyptus brownii, commonly known as the Brown's box or Reid River box, is a species endemic to Queensland. It is a small to medium-sized tree with hard, tough, fissured bark, lance-shaped adult leaves, flower buds in groups of eleven to fifteen, white flowers and usually cup-shaped fruit.

Description
It has rough, hard, fibrous-flaky bark with whitish patches, pale and patchy grey or grey-brown in colour and is persistent on the trunk and on the larger branches. Flowering mainly occurs from August to October and the flowers are a creamy-white colour.

Taxonomy and naming
Eucalyptus brownii was first formally described by Joseph Maiden and Richard Hind Cambage from specimens collected by Nicholas Daley along the Reid River near Townsville in 1912.  The specific epithet (brownii) honours Robert Brown.

Distribution and habitat
Brown's box grows on plains and gentle slopes in central eastern Queensland. It is found between the Connors River south of Sarina, Barcaldine, Hughenden, Charters Towers and Townsville. It is often found as part of open woodland communities along with Eucalyptus persistens with a shrub layer of Eremophila mitchellii, Psydrax oleifolia, Flindersia maculosa and Lysiphyllum species on clay soils in Cainozoic plains or in association with Eucalyptus cambageana and E. crebra in woodlands on low metamorphic rises.

References

brownii
Flora of Queensland
Myrtales of Australia
Plants described in 1914
Taxa named by Joseph Maiden